Alpinoscincus is a genus of skinks in the subfamily Eugongylinae. The genus Alpinoscincus is endemic to New Guinea.

Species
There are 2 species:
Alpinoscincus alpinus Greer, Allison & Cogger, 2005
Alpinoscincus subalpinus Greer, Allison & Cogger, 2005

Nota bene: A binomial authority in parentheses indicates that the species was originally described in a genus other than Alpinoscincus.

References

Alpinoscincus
Skinks of New Guinea
Lizard genera
Endemic fauna of New Guinea